The  Sikorsky S-5 was an early Russian single seat biplane design by Igor Sikorsky, completed in late April 1911.

Design and development 

The S-5 was powered by a  Argus water-cooled engine turning a propeller Sikorsky designed and built himself. The fabric covering the wooden wings was tightened with pure alcohol and glue mixed with boiling water. The fuselage structure was left exposed. Instead of separate levers to control the elevator and ailerons as in his previous aircraft, Sikorsky designed a single control lever with a wheel allowing control of pitch and roll. This "control column" included a button switch to momentarily deactivate the ignition thereby controlling engine power. The rudder controls were reversed, because it better suited Sikorsky's tactility of the machine.

Operational history
The S-5 was tested in a series of 20 to 30-second straight-line flights, over a period of three weeks, before the designer was able to make what he called his first real flight of four minutes, in a circuit of the field, on 17 May 1911.

After outperforming Imperial Russian Army aircraft during manoeuvres watched by Czar Nicholas II in September, the S-5 earned Igor Sikorsky his first income with a series of exhibition flights during a country fair at Belaya Tserkov, near Kiev. Between nine and ten flying hours were logged before the S-5 was lost in late fall. The crash was caused by fuel starvation due to debris (a mosquito) blocking the carburetor jet.

Specifications

References

S-005
1910s Russian experimental aircraft
Single-engined tractor aircraft
Rotary-engined aircraft
Biplanes
Aircraft first flown in 1911